The 1910 South Australian Football League season was the 34th season of the top-level Australian rules football competition in South Australia.

 won its 6th SAFL premiership, by defeating Sturt, while its second Championship of Australia was won by defeating Collingwood.

Ladder

1910 SAFL Finals

Grand Final

References 

SAFL
South Australian National Football League seasons